The 1986 Lilian Cup was the 5th season of the competition. The four top placed teams for the previous season took part in the competition.

The format of the competition was changed from including a group stage prior to the final to a straight knock-out competition. The competition was held between 2 and 10 September 1986.
 
The competition was won by Maccabi Tel Aviv, who had beaten Maccabi Haifa 2–1 in the final.

Results

Semi-finals

3rd-4th Place Match

Final

References

Lilian 1986
Lilian Cup